Hallway of the Gods is an album by the Legendary Pink Dots, released in 1997.

Critical reception
The Columbus Dispatch thought that "the acoustic, Bowie-esque 'Lucifer Landed', with its grandiose strings and woodwinds, is mesmerizing, and the psychedelic 'The Hanged Man' feels like a musical out-of-body experience." The Denver Post stated: "Something of a Pink Floyd for the '90s, the Dots offer gnarled psychedelic pop, weird tape effects and spooky lyrics."

AllMusic wrote that "this 1997 entry from the band's continuing exploration in dark psychedelia is, like so many of the Legendary Pink Dots' efforts, a winner in both quiet and overwhelming modes."

Track listing 

(*) Bonus track on the limited edition vinyl release.

Credits
Qa'Sepel - voice, keyboards, destroyed lyre
Silverman (Phil Knight) - keyboards
Niels van Hoornblower - horns, flute, electric horns
Ryan Moore - acoustic & electric guitar, bass, drums, theremin
Atwyn (Edwin von Trippenhof) - electric guitar, squelch bass
Frank Verschuuren - sound devices
Nienke - lady voice
Calyxx - little voice

References

1997 albums
The Legendary Pink Dots albums